Hemant Singh (born 10 November 1988) is an Indian cricketer. He made his Twenty20 debut for Railways in the 2016–17 Inter State Twenty-20 Tournament on 29 January 2017.

References

External links
 

1988 births
Living people
Indian cricketers
Railways cricketers
People from New Delhi